Group A of the EuroBasket 2013 took place between 4 and 9 September 2013. The group played all of its games at the Tivoli Hall in Ljubljana, Slovenia.

The group composed of Belgium, France, Germany, Great Britain, Israel and Ukraine. The three best ranked teams advanced to the second round.

Standings
|}

All times are local (UTC+2)

4 September

Israel vs. Great Britain

Belgium vs. Ukraine

France vs. Germany

5 September

Ukraine vs. Israel

Germany vs. Belgium

Great Britain vs. France

6 September

Germany vs. Ukraine

Belgium vs. Great Britain

France vs. Israel

8 September

Great Britain vs. Germany

Ukraine vs. France

Israel vs. Belgium

9 September

Great Britain vs. Ukraine

Germany vs. Israel

Belgium vs. France

External links
 Standings and fixtures

Group A
2013–14 in French basketball
2013–14 in Ukrainian basketball
2013–14 in British basketball
2013–14 in German basketball
2013–14 in Israeli basketball
2013–14 in Belgian basketball